Isaías Guardiola Villaplana (born 1 October 1984, in Petrer) is a Spanish handballer who plays for TBV Lemgo and the Spanish national team. He is a twin brother of Gedeón Guardiola, also a handballer.

References

External links
 BM Atlético profile

1984 births
Living people
People from Vinalopó Mitjà
Spanish male handball players
Liga ASOBAL players
BM Ciudad Real players
Sportspeople from the Province of Alicante
Twin sportspeople
Spanish twins
21st-century Spanish people